Frithjof Skonnord (2 April 1887 – 30 September 1971) was a Norwegian footballer. He played in one match for the Norway national football team in 1908.

References

External links
 

1887 births
1971 deaths
Norwegian footballers
Norway international footballers
Place of birth missing
Association footballers not categorized by position